Robert Burton (fl. 1380–1397) of Grimsby, Lincolnshire, was an English politician.

He was a Member (MP) of the Parliament of England for Great Grimsby in January 1380, 1385, February 1388, 1393, 1394, 1395 and January 1397.

He was Mayor of Grimsby in 1392–3.

References

Year of birth missing
Year of death missing
Mayors of Grimsby
English MPs January 1380
English MPs 1385
English MPs February 1388
English MPs 1393
English MPs 1394
English MPs 1395
English MPs January 1397
Members of the Parliament of England for Great Grimsby